Emmbrook is a suburb of the town of Wokingham in the county of  Berkshire, England.

The suburb takes its name from the Emm Brook, a small river that is a tributary of the River Loddon.

There are three schools in Emmbrook: Emmbrook Junior School, Emmbrook Infant School and The Emmbrook School (11-18yrs (Wand)). The latter is one of four main secondary schools serving Wokingham and one of two schools in Wokingham with a specialism in Maths and Computing along with St Crispin's.

Other local amenities in Emmbrook include three pubs The Dog and Duck, The Rifle Volunteer and The Emmbrook Inn (formerly The Thatched Cottage), shops, a village hall and a social centre.

References

Wokingham